Scionti is an Italian surname. Notable people with the surname include:

Michael Scionti (born 1968), American judge and politician
Silvio Scionti (1882–1973), Italian-born American pianist and teacher
Giuseppe Scionti (born 1986), Italian entrepreneur

Italian-language surnames